Andrés Felipe Herrera (born May 6, 1996 in Bogotá) is a professional male squash player who represented Colombia. He reached a career-high world ranking of World No. 115 in January 2017.

References

External links 
 
 

1996 births
Living people
Colombian male squash players
Sportspeople from Bogotá
Squash players at the 2015 Pan American Games
Pan American Games gold medalists for Colombia
Pan American Games medalists in squash
Squash players at the 2019 Pan American Games
Medalists at the 2015 Pan American Games
Medalists at the 2019 Pan American Games
21st-century Colombian people
South American Games gold medalists for Colombia
South American Games bronze medalists for Colombia
South American Games medalists in squash
Competitors at the 2022 South American Games